IOJ may refer to:

International Organization of Journalists
Islami Oikya Jote